Tan Wee Kiong  (born 21 May 1989) is a Malaysian badminton player in the doubles event. He is well-known for his former partnership with Goh V Shem, which began at the 2014 Thomas Cup. Together, Tan and Goh won the gold medal in the men's doubles and the mixed team event at the 2014 Commonwealth Games. They also won bronze at the 2014 Asian Games. In their Olympic debut at the 2016 Rio Olympics, they won the silver medal, becoming the first Malaysian pair to achieve such a feat since 1996. In November 2016, they reached a career-high ranking of world number 1, making them the fourth ever Malaysian men's doubles pair to do so, after Cheah Soon Kit and Yap Kim Hock, Chan Chong Ming and Chew Choon Eng, and Koo Kien Keat and Tan Boon Heong.

Early and personal life 
Tan was born on 21 May 1989 in Johor to Tan Cham Swe and Tan Yok Hua. His brothers, Tan Wee Tat and Tan Wee Gieen, are also professional badminton players. Tan started playing badminton when he was 6 and joined Bukit Jalil Sport School when he was 13. Tan and beautician Chia Shi Leng wed in 2016. Due to Tan's tight schedule, their wedding reception was held in December 2017 at The St. Regis Hotel Kuala Lumpur, with 700 guests in attendance. The couple welcomed their first son in March 2019.

Career

Early career 
Tan started his junior career as a mixed doubles player. However, he later transitioned into men's doubles. In 2007, he won the Asian Junior Championships mixed doubles gold medal with Woon Khe Wei. They were seeded second and first at the 2006 and 2007 World Junior Championships but were defeated in the fourth round on both occasions.

2010–2014 
In 2010, he briefly partnered Mak Hee Chun. They played together at the 2010 Asian Games but were beaten in the round of 32. Later, he partnered Hoon Thien How. They reached a career high of no. 7 worldwide. Their campaign at the 2013 World Championships ended in the third round after a loss to Cai Yun and Fu Haifeng. Later that year, the pair reached their first ever Super Series semifinal at the French Open. Shortly after, the two won their first career title at the Macau Open. They were runners-up at the China Open and in that same year, they qualified for the Super Series Finals after the withdrawal of compatriots, Koo Kien Keat and Tan Boon Heong. However, they failed to advance past the group stage.

Tan played his last tournament with Hoon at the 2014 World Championships in August 2014. Their campaign ended in the quarterfinals where they lost to the eventual champions, Ko Sung-hyun and Shin Baek-cheol.

2014–2021 
In May 2014, Tan was scratch partnered with Goh V Shem to play second men's doubles at the 2014 Thomas Cup. They won all four matches that they contested and defeated several highly ranked players along the way despite this being the first time ever that the two has played together internationally. Their debut partnership at the Thomas Cup was widely praised. Malaysia made it to the finals for the first time in 12 years but was narrowly defeated by Japan with a score of 2–3.

In August, Tan represented Malaysia at the 2014 Commonwealth Games in Glasgow with Goh V Shem. They went on to take the gold medal and were the only medalists in the tournament who were not seeded. En route to the gold medal, they defeated top seeds, Chris Adcock and Andrew Ellis of England in the semifinals as well as 3rd seeds, Danny Bawa Chrisnanta and Chayut Triyachart of Singapore in the finals. They also won all five matches they contested in the mixed team event, helping Malaysia secure their third consecutive mixed team gold medal at the Commonwealth Games.

Following the World Championships in September, Tan and Goh have been officially partnered. They represented Malaysia at the 2014 Asian Games where they made it to semifinals but were defeated by top seeds, Lee Yong-dae and Yoo Yeon-seong of South Korea. The defeat automatically earned them the bronze medal as there is no bronze medal playoffs in badminton at the Asian Games. En route to the semifinals, they defeated 5th seeds, Lee Sheng-mu and Tsai Chia-hsin of Chinese Taipei in the round of 32 and 3rd seeds, Hiroyuki Endo and Kenichi Hayakawa of Japan in the quarterfinals with a score of 21–16, 21–16.

They were semifinalists at the Malaysia Masters in January that year. In March, they became runners-up to Cai Yun and Lu Kai at the Swiss Open. At the 2015 Sudirman Cup in May, Goh and Tan managed to upset the World No. 1, Lee Yong-dae and Yoo Yeon-seong in the first group tie against South Korea. Malaysia topped Group D and were drawn against South Korea once again in the quarterfinals but failed to advance. At the 2015 World Championships in August, Tan and Goh defeated defending champions Ko Sung-hyun and Shin Baek-cheol in the second round but were defeated in the third round. Tan and Goh won their first title together at the 2015 U.S. Grand Prix. They then went on to win their second title at the 2016 Syed Modi International Grand Prix Gold. They then became beaten semifinalists at the All England Open and the Indian Super Series. At the 2016 Thomas Cup, Tan won three out of his five matches played. Malaysia made it to the semifinals but lost to eventual winners Denmark.

Tan and Goh made their Olympics debut at the 2016 Summer Olympics. They won all their matches in the group stage to top group B and qualify for the quarter-finals. In the quarter-finals, they stun Lee Yong-dae and Yoo Yeon-seong to reach the semi-finals. Tan and Goh later beat Chai Biao and Hong Wei in the semifinals. They once again face Fu Haifeng and Zhang Nan in the finals but this time falling short with a score of 21–16, 11–21, 21–23, taking home silver.

In October 2016, Tan won his first Super Series tournament title with Goh at the 2016 Denmark Open. In November, they became the new world number 1 in men's doubles. In December, Tan and Goh won the 2016 Dubai World Superseries Finals.

He briefly partnered with Ong Yew Sin before resuming his partnership with Goh in early 2018.

His partnership was resumed with Goh V Shem in order to help Malaysia in 2018 Thomas Cup. In the group stage, they defeated Vladimir Ivanov and Ivan Sozonov from Russia. They were defeated by Denmark and Kevin Sanjaya Sukamuljo and Marcus Fernaldi Gideon of Indonesia by three sets 19–21, 22–20 and 13–21.

2021–present 
In August 2021, Tan ended his partnership with Goh V Shem and sought Tan Kian Meng as his new partner. His first tournament with Kian Meng was the 2021 Dutch Open where they made it to the finals and lost by three sets 14–21, 21–18, 20–22 to Terry Hee and Loh Kean Hean from Singapore.

Achievements

Olympic Games 
Men's doubles

Commonwealth Games 
Men's doubles

Asian Games 
Men's doubles

Asian Junior Championships 
Boys' doubles

Mixed doubles

BWF World Tour (2 titles, 3 runners-up) 
The BWF World Tour, which was announced on 19 March 2017 and implemented in 2018, is a series of elite badminton tournaments sanctioned by the Badminton World Federation (BWF). The BWF World Tours are divided into levels of World Tour Finals, Super 1000, Super 750, Super 500, Super 300 (part of the HSBC World Tour), and the BWF Tour Super 100.

Men's doubles

BWF Superseries (2 titles, 1 runner-up) 
The BWF Superseries, which was launched on 14 December 2006 and implemented in 2007, was a series of elite badminton tournaments, sanctioned by the Badminton World Federation (BWF). BWF Superseries levels were Superseries and Superseries Premier. A season of Superseries consisted of twelve tournaments around the world that had been introduced since 2011. Successful players were invited to the Superseries Finals, which were held at the end of each year.

Men's doubles

  BWF Superseries Finals tournament
  BWF Superseries Premier tournament
  BWF Superseries tournament

BWF Grand Prix (3 titles, 2 runners-up) 
The BWF Grand Prix had two levels, the Grand Prix and Grand Prix Gold. It was a series of badminton tournaments sanctioned by the Badminton World Federation (BWF) and played between 2007 and 2017.

Men's doubles

  BWF Grand Prix Gold tournament
  BWF Grand Prix tournament

BWF International Challenge/Series (1 title, 3 runners-up) 
Men's doubles

Mixed doubles

  BWF International Challenge tournament
  BWF International Series tournament

Honours

Honours of Malaysia 
  :
  Member of the Order of the Defender of the Realm (A.M.N.) (2017)

References

External links 

 Tan Wee Kiong at Badminton Association of Malaysia
 
 
 

1989 births
Living people
People from Muar
Malaysian sportspeople of Chinese descent
Malaysian male badminton players
Badminton players at the 2016 Summer Olympics
Olympic badminton players of Malaysia
Olympic silver medalists for Malaysia
Olympic medalists in badminton
Medalists at the 2016 Summer Olympics
Badminton players at the 2014 Commonwealth Games
Badminton players at the 2018 Commonwealth Games
Commonwealth Games gold medallists for Malaysia
Commonwealth Games silver medallists for Malaysia
Commonwealth Games bronze medallists for Malaysia
Commonwealth Games medallists in badminton
Badminton players at the 2010 Asian Games
Badminton players at the 2014 Asian Games
Badminton players at the 2018 Asian Games
Asian Games bronze medalists for Malaysia
Asian Games medalists in badminton
Medalists at the 2014 Asian Games
Competitors at the 2007 Southeast Asian Games
Competitors at the 2015 Southeast Asian Games
Southeast Asian Games bronze medalists for Malaysia
Southeast Asian Games medalists in badminton
World No. 1 badminton players
Members of the Order of the Defender of the Realm
Medallists at the 2014 Commonwealth Games
Medallists at the 2018 Commonwealth Games